Osun Bowale Osunniyi (born October 21, 1998) is an American college basketball player for the Iowa State Cyclones of the Big 12 Conference (Big 12).

High school career
Osunniyi started playing basketball in eighth grade, after moving from Pleasantville, New Jersey to Somers Point. He attended Mainland Regional High School in Linwood, New Jersey, joining the varsity team as a junior and starting for the first time in his senior year. His coach, Dan Williams, considered him an NCAA Division III prospect before he grew three inches (7.6 cm) prior to his senior season. Osunniyi played a postgraduate season at Putnam Science Academy in Putnam, Connecticut. He led his team to the National Prep Championship, where he was named MVP of the title game. He initially committed to playing college basketball for La Salle before switching his commitment to St. Bonaventure.  He turned down offers from traditional basketball powers, such as Syracuse and Georgetown.

College career
As a freshman at St. Bonaventure, Osunniyi averaged 7.5 points, 7.6 rebounds and 2.6 blocks per game. He led all NCAA Division I freshmen and ranked sixth in the nation in blocks. He was named to the Atlantic 10 All-Rookie and All-Defensive teams. As a sophomore, Osunniyi averaged 10.8 points, 8.4 rebounds and 2.5 blocks per game. He earned Third Team All-Atlantic 10 and All-Defensive Team honors. In his junior season, Osunniyi was a Second Team All-Atlantic 10 selection and Atlantic 10 Defensive Player of the Year. He recorded 14 points, 12 rebounds and three blocks in a 74–65 win over VCU at the Atlantic 10 tournament final. He was named tournament most outstanding player. As a junior, Osunniyi averaged 10.7 points, 9.4 rebounds, and 2.9 blocks per game. He was again named to the Second Team All-Atlantic 10 as a senior as well as Defensive Player of the Year.

On May 5, 2022, Osunniyi announced he was transferring to Iowa State University.

Career statistics

College

|-
| style="text-align:left;"| 2018–19
| style="text-align:left;"| St. Bonaventure
| 34 || 21 || 27.2 || .571 || – || .667 || 7.6 || .8 || .5 || 2.7 || 7.5
|-
| style="text-align:left;"| 2019–20
| style="text-align:left;"| St. Bonaventure
| 24 || 19 || 30.0 || .615 || – || .576 || 8.4 || 1.2 || .7 || 2.4 || 10.8
|-
| style="text-align:left;"| 2020–21
| style="text-align:left;"| St. Bonaventure
| 21 || 21 || 34.3 || .571 || .000 || .681 || 9.4 || 2.4 || .8 || 2.9 || 10.7
|-
| style="text-align:left;"| 2021–22
| style="text-align:left;"| St. Bonaventure
| 32 || 32 || 30.6 || .613 || .500 || .641 || 7.5 || 1.5 || .5 || 2.9 || 11.3
|- class="sortbottom"
| style="text-align:center;" colspan="2"| Career
| 111 || 93 || 30.1 || .595 || .333 || .644 || 8.1 || 1.4 || .6 || 2.7 || 9.9

Personal life
Osunniyi is of Nigerian descent. His name, Osun Bowale, translates to "angel of love and fertility has returned home."

References

External links
St. Bonaventure Bonnies bio

1998 births
Living people
American men's basketball players
Basketball players from New Jersey
People from Pleasantville, New Jersey
People from Somers Point, New Jersey
American people of Nigerian descent
Power forwards (basketball)
Centers (basketball)
Mainland Regional High School (New Jersey) alumni
Sportspeople from Atlantic County, New Jersey
St. Bonaventure Bonnies men's basketball players